Call signs in India are unique identifiers for telecommunications and broadcasting in India. The Ministry of Communications and Information Technology regulates call signs nationally, and the International Telecommunication Union regulates call signs internationally.

Call sign blocks
The International Telecommunication Union has assigned India the following call signs:

Note: The Andaman and Nicobar Islands come under ITU Zone 49 and CQ Zone 26.

In addition to the above, the base of Maitri and the abandoned station of Dakshin Gangotri, also use the Indian callsigns but come under ITU Zone 67 and CQ Zone 38 respectively.

Defunct callsigns 
 CR8 – Portuguese India
 FN8 – French India
 AC3 – the former monarchy of Sikkim, now a state of India

Call signs

The International Telecommunication Union (ITU) has divided all countries into three regions; India is located in ITU Region 3. These regions are further divided into two competing zones, the ITU and the CQ. Mainland India and the Lakshadweep Islands come under ITU Zone 41 and CQ Zone 22, and the Andaman and Nicobar Islands under ITU Zone 49 and CQ Zone 26. The ITU has assigned to India call-sign blocks 8TA to 8YZ, VTA to VWZ, and ATA to AWZ. The WPC allots the individual call-signs, or call sign series.

Assignments for amateur radio

Amateur radio or ham radio is practised by more than 16,000 licensed users. The first amateur radio operator was licensed in 1921, and by the mid-1930s, there were around 20 amateur radio operators in India. Amateur radio operators have played an important part in the Indian independence movement with the establishment of pro-independence radio stations in the 1940s, which were illegal. The Wireless and Planning and Coordination Wing (WPC), a division of the Ministry of Communications and Information Technology, regulates amateur radio in India. The WPC assigns call signs, issues amateur radio licences, conducts exams, allots frequency spectrum, and monitors the radio waves.

See also
Amateur radio in India 
Amateur Station Operator's Certificate
Hamfest Celebrations in India

References

External links
 Hamradioindia.org - An Introduction to Amateur Radio
 How to become a HAM radio operator in India, 2009-06-14
 Kayalpattinam Ham Radio Society
Indian Callsign Search Server

India
Communications in India
Mass media in India